KDUC (94.3 FM) is a commercial radio station that is licensed to Barstow, California and serves the Barstow and Victor Valley areas, as well as along Interstate 15 to Baker, California. The station is simulcast on KDUQ (102.5 FM), which is licensed to Ludlow, California and broadcasts along Interstate 40 east of Barstow. Both stations are owned by California Communications of Barstow, LLC and broadcast a contemporary hit radio music format branded as "The Duck".

History
KDUC first signed on June 4, 1986 in Barstow, California. Owned by First American Communications Corporation, the station broadcast a contemporary hit radio (CHR) format. On July 7, 1995, First American launched KDUQ, a repeater of KDUC that transmitted from Ludlow, California to extend coverage along Interstate 40 across the Mojave Desert east of Barstow. At the time, both stations carried a hot adult contemporary music format. In December 1998, First American sold KDUC, KDUQ, and AM sister station KSZL to Pleasant Gap, Pennsylvania-based Tele-Media Broadcasting LLC for $875,000.

In June 2008, Dos Costas Communications Corporation sold the rhythmic contemporary-formatted KDUC and KDUQ, as well as KSZL and KXXZ, to California Communications of Barstow, LLC for $4.3 million.

Repeater

References

External links

DUC
Rhythmic contemporary radio stations in the United States
Barstow, California
Victorville, California
Mass media in San Bernardino County, California
Radio stations established in 1986
1986 establishments in California